Saint-Hubert is a city and municipality of Wallonia located in the province of Luxembourg, Belgium. 

On 1 January 2007 the municipality, which covers 111.16 km² (42.92 sq mi), had 5,737 inhabitants, giving a population density of 51.6 inhabitants per square kilometre.

The municipality consists of the following districts: Arville, Awenne, Hatrival, Mirwart, Saint-Hubert, and Vesqueville. Other population centers include: Lorcy and Poix-Saint-Hubert.

The town is named in commemoration of Saint Hubert, whose body was moved in 825 to the Benedictine Abbey of Andage, thereafter called Abbey of Saint-Hubert.

Climate

See also
 List of protected heritage sites in Saint-Hubert, Belgium

References

External links

 Official website (in French)

 
Cities in Wallonia
Municipalities of Luxembourg (Belgium)
Wallonia's Major Heritage